The 1954–55 NBA season was the Warriors' 9th season in the NBA.

Offseason

Roster

Regular season

Season standings

x – clinched playoff spot

Record vs. opponents

Game log

Awards and records
 Paul Arizin, NBA All-Star Game
 Neil Johnston, NBA All-Star Game
 Neil Johnston, NBA Scoring Champion
 Neil Johnston, All-NBA First Team

References

Golden State Warriors seasons
Philadelphia